American Viscose Corporation was an American division of the British firm Courtaulds, which manufactured rayon and other synthetic fibres. The company operated from 1910 to 1976 when it was renamed Avtex. Avtex closed in 1990.

History

Established in 1909, it became the largest supplier of rayon and the first company to make artificial silk in the United States.

American Viscose had plants at Marcus Hook, Pennsylvania (established 1910), Roanoke, Virginia (1916), Lewistown, Pennsylvania (1920), Parkersburg, West Virginia (1927), Meadville, Pennsylvania (1929), Nitro, West Virginia, and Front Royal, Virginia (1940). After a 1946 merger with Sylvania Industrial Corporation (not to be confused with lighting and electronics manufacturer Sylvania), it gained a plant at Fredericksburg, Virginia.

The company was founded by Samuel Agar Salvage, as a division of Courtaulds and began production as "The American Viscose Corporation-(AVC)" in 1910. Later it was branded as "Crown Rayon". In 1941, to purchase supplies for the War, the British government were pressured by the U.S. Government to sell the company to 152 American investment firms in a deal lead by Morgan, Stanley & Co. and Dillion, Reed & Co. The 228,480 shares were sold to the public. In 1949, The company passed into the control of the Monsanto Corporation. (Courtaulds resumed manufacture of rayon in the United States in 1952, at a new plant in Axis, Alabama). In 1963 it was purchased by FMC Corporation. In 1974 the plant in Parkersburg, West Virginia was closed. FMC sold off the division in 1976 to its employees, when it was renamed Avtex Fibers.

In 1980 Avtex Fibers closed their plant in Nitro, West Virginia that manufactured rayon staple. In 1983, Avtex Fibers was the largest US manufacturer of rayon fiber, as well as operating plants that made polyester and acetate yarn.

Many of its closed plants have become Superfund pollution cleanup sites. The former plant site at Front Royal, Virginia was used for manufacturing from 1940 until 1989, when the plant was closed after being cited for more than 2,000 environmental violations over five years, including emissions of polychlorinated biphenyls (PCBs) into the nearby Shenandoah River. The plant was demolished in 1997, and is being restored by FMC in conjunction with the United States Environmental Protection Agency.

The company made rayon fiber for fabric and also rayon cord for reinforcement of pneumatic automobile tires. Declining sales and high internal costs caused Avtex to close its rayon operations in 1988, briefly restarting to produce fiber for the aerospace industry, and then permanently closing in 1990 for economic and environmental reasons.

References

External links
 

Textile companies of the United States
FMC Corporation
American companies established in 1910
1910 establishments in Pennsylvania
Defunct companies based in Pennsylvania